Paul Popowich is a Canadian actor. He is best known for his portrayal of Mr. Smith, an angel who helps people change their pasts, in season two of Twice in a Lifetime. Popovich has performed in many television series, including Beverly Hills, 90210, and features and theatre.

Career
Popowich made his film debut at age of 15 when he received his first professional role as Cass in the movie Tommy Tricker and the Stamp Traveller.

He also starred as drummer Jesse on the Canadian television show Catwalk, about a struggling band of musicians, and as Joe Hardy in the 1995 The Hardy Boys television series.

He appeared in the Star Trek: Deep Space Nine episode "Valiant", as Tim Watters, a Starfleet cadet who received a field promotion to Captain.

In 2012, he appeared in Season 12 of Degrassi: The Next Generation as Clare Edwards' boss, Asher Shostak. In addition, Popowich has worked on projects including Angela's Eyes (2006), I Me Wed (2007), The Bridge (2010), Cracked (2010), and Hemlock Grove (2013).

In December 2018, Popowich portrayed Canadian detective Tom Barrow in an episode of Investigation Discovery's The Case That Haunts Me titled "Devil's Triangle".

Filmography

Film

Television

References

External links

1973 births
Canadian male television actors
Living people
Male actors from Hamilton, Ontario